The 1998–99 WHL season was the 33rd season for the Western Hockey League.  Eighteen teams completed a 72-game season.  The Calgary Hitmen won the President's Cup.

League notes
The Edmonton Ice relocated to Cranbrook, British Columbia to become the Kootenay Ice.

Regular season

Final standings

Scoring leaders
Note: GP = Games played; G = Goals; A = Assists; Pts = Points; PIM = Penalties in minutes

Goaltending leaders
Note: GP = Games played; Min = Minutes played; W = Wins; L = Losses; T = Ties ; GA = Goals against; SO = Total shutouts; SV% = Save percentage; GAA = Goals against average

1999 WHL Playoffs
Top eight teams in the Eastern Conference (East and Central divisions) qualified for playoffs
Top six teams in the Western Conference (division) qualified for the playoffs

Conference quarterfinals

Eastern Conference

Western Conference

Conference semifinals

Conference finals

WHL Championship

All-Star game

On January 20, the Western Conference defeated the Eastern Conference 11–9 at Lethbridge, Alberta before a crowd of 5,071.

WHL awards

All-Star Teams

See also
1999 Memorial Cup
1999 NHL Entry Draft
1998 in sports
1999 in sports

References
whl.ca
 2005–06 WHL Guide

Western Hockey League seasons
WHL
WHL